1963 in Korea may refer to:
1963 in North Korea
1963 in South Korea